José Christian González (born March 22, 1993) is a Mexican footballer.

Career
Gonzalez was a member of the Houston Dynamo Academy from 2011 to 2013, before transferring to USL Pro club Sacramento Republic in March 2014.

Honours
Sacramento Republic
 USL Cup: 2014

References

1993 births
Living people
Mexican expatriate footballers
Sacramento Republic FC players
Association football defenders
Footballers from Michoacán
Mexican footballers
Expatriate soccer players in the United States
USL Championship players